Asmae El Moudir (born 1990 in Salé) is a Moroccan film director, screenwriter and producer.

Biography 
El Moudir holds a master's degree in documentary cinema from the Abdelmalek Essaâdi University in Tetouan, and a master's degree in production at the Superior Institute of Information and Communication of Rabat in Rabat. She studied at La Fémis  in Paris. She graduated in 2010 from the Moroccan Film Academy in Film Directing / Fiction.

After making a number of short films, El Moudir directed The Mother of All Lies (Le mensonge originel), her first feature film. The next year, she directed The Postcard, her first documentary feature film. 

She has directed documentaries for SNRT, Al Jazeera Documentary, BBC and Al Araby TV. She has won important national and international awards which have been screened in Festivals worldwide and presented on co-production markets.

In 2022, she was part of Netflix Equity Fund with Four Female Arab Filmmakers.

Awards 

 Grand Prix at the International Women's Film Festival in Toronto (2021)
 Grand Prix at the IsReal Film Festival in Nuoro (2021)
 Directing prizes and the Grand Prix of the El-Ayoun Documentary Film Festival (2019)

Filmography 

 2010: The Last Bullet (La Dernière balle) 
 2011: The Colors of Silence (Les couleurs de silence)
 2013: Thank God It's Friday
 2015: Rough Cut 
 2016: Harma
 2019: Guerre oubliée (Forgotten War)
 2019: The Mother of All Lies
 2020: The Postcard (Fi Zaouiyati Oummi)

References

External links 
Asmae El Moudir - IMDb

Living people
1990 births
Moroccan film directors
Moroccan screenwriters
Abdelmalek Essaâdi University alumni